Marco Aurelio Fontana (born 12 October 1984) is an Italian racing cyclist. He won the bronze medal in the cross-country mountain bike race at the 2012 Summer Olympics.

Major results

Cyclo-cross

2003–2004
 3rd National Under-23 Championships
2004–2005
 2nd National Under-23 Championships
2005–2006
 1st  National Under-23 Championships
 UCI Under-23 World Cup
3rd Wetzikon
 4th UEC European Under-23 Championships
2006–2007
 1st Valtellina Iperal Cross
 2nd National Championships
 2nd GP Città di Verbania
 3rd Ciclocross del Ponte
2007–2008
 1st  National Championships
 1st GP Città di Verbania
 2nd Meilen
2008–2009
 1st Trofeo Città di Lucca
 1st GP Città San Martino
 2nd National Championships
 2nd Ciclocross del Ponte
2009–2010
 1st  National Championships
 1st GP San Martino
2010–2011
 1st  National Championships
 2nd GP Wetzikon
 7th UCI World Championships
2011–2012
 1st  National Championships
 1st Memorial Romano Scotti
 2nd Ciclocross del Ponte
2012–2013
 1st  National Championships
 1st Gran Premio Mamma E Papa Guerciotti
 UCI World Cup
3rd Rome
 3rd Dagmersellen
2013–2014
 1st  National Championships
2014–2015
 1st  National Championships
 Giro d'Italia Cross
1st Roma
1st Padova
 3rd Trofeo Coop Ed. Brugherio 82
 10th UCI World Championships
2016–2017
 1st Trofeo di Gorizia
 2nd National Championships
2017–2018
 3rd National Championships
 3rd Trofeo di Gorizia

MTB

References

External links
 
 
 
 
 

1984 births
Living people
People from Giussano
Italian male cyclists
Olympic bronze medalists for Italy
Olympic cyclists of Italy
Cyclists at the 2008 Summer Olympics
Cyclists at the 2012 Summer Olympics
Cyclists at the 2016 Summer Olympics
Olympic medalists in cycling
Cyclo-cross cyclists
Cross-country mountain bikers
Medalists at the 2012 Summer Olympics
Cyclists from the Province of Monza e Brianza
UCI Mountain Bike World Champions (men)
Cyclists at the 2015 European Games
European Games competitors for Italy
Italian mountain bikers